The Council on Foreign Aid was a public body in Norway, established by the Parliament of Norway on 1 January 1984. It consisted of 20 members, appointed by the Ministry of Development Cooperation (later merged into the Ministry of Foreign Affairs). It was part of the official development aid apparatus of Norway, and had an advisory role in relation to the government. The council was dissolved in 1988. During its four-year existence, the council had two Presidents, Bjarne A. Waaler (1984–1986) and Marit Nybakk (1987–1988).

References

Ministry of Foreign Affairs (Norway)
Defunct government agencies of Norway
1984 establishments in Norway
1988 disestablishments in Norway